In mathematics, an integral polytope has an associated Ehrhart polynomial that encodes the relationship between the volume of a polytope and the number of integer points the polytope contains. The theory of Ehrhart polynomials can be seen as a higher-dimensional generalization of Pick's theorem in the Euclidean plane.

These polynomials are named after Eugène Ehrhart who studied them in the 1960s.

Definition

be the number of lattice points contained in the polytope .

for all positive integers .

The Ehrhart polynomial of the interior of a closed convex polytope  can be computed as:

This result is known as Ehrhart–Macdonald reciprocity.

Examples

Let  be a -dimensional unit hypercube whose vertices are the integer lattice points all of whose coordinates are 0 or 1. In terms of inequalities,

Additionally, if we evaluate  at negative integers, then

 

as we would expect from Ehrhart–Macdonald reciprocity.

Many other figurate numbers can be expressed as Ehrhart polynomials.

Ehrhart quasi-polynomials
Let  be a rational polytope. In other words, suppose

Just as with integral polytopes, Ehrhart–Macdonald reciprocity holds, that is,

Examples of Ehrhart quasi-polynomials
Let  be a polygon with vertices (0,0), (0,2), (1,1) and (0). The number of integer points in  will be counted by the quasi-polynomial

Interpretation of coefficients
If  is closed (i.e. the boundary faces belong to ), some of the coefficients of  have an easy interpretation:

When  is a closed convex polytope, .

The Betke–Kneser theorem
Ulrich Betke and Martin Kneser established the following characterization of the Ehrhart coefficients.

Ehrhart series
We can define a generating function for the Ehrhart polynomial of an integral -dimensional polytope  as

 

This series can be expressed as a rational function.

The -vector is in general not unimodal, but it is whenever it is symmetric, and the polytope has a regular unimodular triangulation.

Ehrhart series for rational polytopes
As in the case of polytopes with integer vertices, one defines the Ehrhart series for a rational polytope. For a d-dimensional rational polytope , where  is the smallest integer such that  is an integer polytope ( is called the denominator of ), then one has

Non-leading coefficient bounds 
The polynomial's non-leading coefficients  in the representation 

 

can be upper bounded:

where  is a Stirling number of the first kind. Lower bounds also exist.

Toric variety
Formulas for the other coefficients are much harder to get; Todd classes of toric varieties, the Riemann–Roch theorem as well as Fourier analysis have been used for this purpose.

Ehrhart polynomials can be studied for their own sake. For instance, one could ask questions related to the roots of an Ehrhart polynomial. Furthermore, some authors have pursued the question of how these polynomials could be classified.

Generalizations
It is possible to study the number of integer points in a polytope  if we dilate some facets of  but not others. In other words, one would like to know the number of integer points in semi-dilated polytopes. It turns out that such a counting function will be what is called a multivariate quasi-polynomial. An Ehrhart-type reciprocity theorem will also hold for such a counting function.

Counting the number of integer points in semi-dilations of polytopes has applications in enumerating the number of different dissections of regular polygons and the number of non-isomorphic unrestricted codes, a particular kind of code in the field of coding theory.

See also
 Quasi-polynomial
 Stanley's reciprocity theorem

Notes

References
.
.
.
. Introduces the Fourier analysis approach and gives references to other related articles.
. Definition and first properties.

.

Figurate numbers
Polynomials
Lattice points
Polytopes